Markus Marek (born January 8, 1961) is a former American football linebacker who played three seasons with the Boston/New Orleans/Portland Breakers of the United States Football League. He played college football at Ohio State University. and attended Brookfield High School in Brookfield, Ohio. Marek led the Ohio State Buckeyes in tackles from 1980 to 1982 and was a Consensus All-American in 1982. He is the career leader in tackles for Ohio State.

References

External links
Just Sports Stats
College stats
Fanbase profile

Living people
1961 births
Players of American football from Ohio
American football linebackers
Ohio State Buckeyes football players
Boston/New Orleans/Portland Breakers players
All-American college football players
People from Trumbull County, Ohio
National Football League replacement players